The 1949–50 Serie A season was the 17th season of the Serie A, the top level of ice hockey in Italy. Nine teams participated in the league, and HC Milan Inter won the championship.

First round

Group A

Group B

Group C

Final round

External links
 Season on hockeytime.net

1949–50 in Italian ice hockey
Serie A (ice hockey) seasons
ItalySerie A